Rostanga rubra, is a species of sea slug, a dorid nudibranch, a marine gastropod mollusc in the family Discodorididae.

Distribution
This species was described from Nice, France. It has been reported from Norway to Spain on the Atlantic Ocean coasts of Europe and from the Canary Islands and Madeira.

DescriptionRostanga rubra is a bright orange to reddish-orange in colour and the dorsum is covered with caryophyllidia; in general it is very similar to other species of Rostanga.

Ecology
This nudibranch is reported to feed on the red sponges, Ophlitaspongia seriata, Clathria atrasanguinea and Ophlitaspongia kildensis'' (family Microcionidae).

References

Discodorididae
Gastropods described in 1818